Sista leken is a 1984 Finnish-Swedish drama film directed by Jon Lindström. Sven Wollter won the award for Best Actor at the 20th Guldbagge Awards.

Cast
 Sven Wollter as Viktor
 Karolina Korpioja as Agneta
 Aino Seppo as Agneta's Mother
 Soli Labbart as Agneta's Grandma
 Tomas Laustiola as Agneta's Father
 Bibi Andersson as Viktor's Wife
 Jacob Hirdwall as Viktor's son
 Ulf Törnroth as Farmer
 Toni Regner as Farmer's wife
 Kalevi Kahra as Ferry man

References

External links
 
 

1984 films
1984 drama films
Finnish drama films
Swedish drama films
1980s Swedish-language films
1980s Swedish films